Viniegra is a Spanish surname. Notable people with the surname include:

Manuel Viniegra (born 1988), Mexican footballer
Salvador Viniegra (1862–1915), Spanish painter and philanthropist

See also
Viniegra de Abajo, municipality in La Rioja, Spain
Viniegra de Arriba, village in La Rioja, Spain

Spanish-language surnames